Thiocarbanilide is an organic chemical compound with the formula (C6H5NH)2CS.  This white solid is a derivative of thiourea.  It is prepared by the reaction of aniline and carbon disulfide.

Uses
Thiocarbanilide is commonly used as a vulcanization accelerator for rubber, and as a stabilizer for PVC and PVDC.  Its use as a vulcanization accelerator was discovered by BF Goodrich chemist George Oenslager.

Reactions
Thiocarbanilide reacts with phosphorus pentachloride or hydrochloric acid, dilute sulfuric acid, acetic anhydride or iodine to produce phenyl isothiocyanate.

Toxicology
Oral, rat:  = 50 mg/kg.

References

Thioureas